Konstantin Leonidovich Volkov (rus. Константин Леонидович Волков) is a Russian professional ice hockey goaltender who plays for HC Dynamo Moscow in the Kontinental Hockey League (KHL). He was selected by the Nashville Predators in the sixth round, 168th overall, of the 2016 NHL Entry Draft.

Playing career 
In the 2014–2015 season, Volkov played three games for SKA-1946 in the MHL with a saving percentage of .882%. He moved to SKA-Varyagi in the MHL B in the middle of the season, where he played 28 matches with a save percentage of .906. He also represented Varyagi in the playoffs with a save percentage of .928. In the 2015-2016 season, Volkov followed the same pattern as before: he initially represented SKA-1946 in 17 matches with a save percentage of .902%, until he moved again to Varyagi, where he played six games with a save percentage of .925 percent.

Volkov continued to represent SKA-1946 in the 2016–2017 season. He played 36 games in the regular season with a save percentage of .934%. He won the goalie of the year award was drafted by the Nashville Predators. In the following season, Volkov was able to represent the KHL club SKA St. Petersburg, but did not play any games, in addition to which he played in the previously familiar SKA-1946 and SKA-Varyagi as well as SKA-Neva. The average save percentage for the whole season was .823. Volkov got to play the playoffs in SKA-1946 with a saven percentage of .935. 

Volkov played in Russia's second highest league level in VHL from 2018 to 2021. In the season 2018–2019, he represented both Sokol Krasnoyarsk and Yugra Khanty-Mansiysk. He played the next two seasons at Jugra and won the series championship in 2021.

In the spring of 2021, Volkov signed a one-year contract with Finnish Liiga club Porin Ässät. He played 37 games that season with a save percentage of .897. Ässät finished 15th (last place) in the 2021–22 season, and he collected 7 wins through 37 regular season games.

In 2022, Volkov signed a two-year contract with HC Dynamo Moscow of the KHL.

Career statistics

References

External links

1997 births
Living people
Ässät players
HC Dynamo Moscow players
Nashville Predators draft picks
Russian ice hockey goaltenders
SKA-1946 players
SKA-Neva players
Sokol Krasnoyarsk players
HC Yugra players